"On a Clear Day I Can't See My Sister" is the eleventh episode of the sixteenth season of the American animated television series The Simpsons. It originally aired on the Fox network in the United States on March 6, 2005. A repeat of this episode also replaced the episode "The Father, the Son, and the Holy Guest Star", which was supposed to air on April 10, 2005, due to the death of Pope John Paul II 8 days earlier.

Plot
The students of Springfield Elementary go on a field trip to the almost completely melted Springfield Glacier. Bart repeatedly bullies Lisa because she is enjoying the trip, and as revenge, Lisa obtains a restraining order against Bart that prevents him from coming within 20 feet (6 m) of her. Lisa uses the restraining order - and a 20-foot (6 m) pole made by Homer to enforce it - to continually torment Bart, making him ride behind the school bus in a shopping cart and eat his school lunch outside in the rain, and later forcing him into the "Gay Interest" section of the library in order to humiliate him.

Marge decides to get an appeal for lifting the restraining order, but Bart repeatedly insults Judge Harm during the hearing, leading Judge Harm to expand the order to 200 feet (60 m), forcing Bart to live in the Simpsons' backyard. He soon realizes that he can live the natural way, taking off his clothes, urinating anywhere he wants and playing with wild dogs. Seeing Bart's feral behavior, Marge suggests to Lisa that she may have gone too far. Lisa responds that Bart has not done any nice things for her recently, but when Marge points out two examples to the contrary, she promises to destroy the order when she thinks of a third thing. She later sees Bart building a statue of her, and is impressed, but when she finds out that it was going to be burned, and Bart lies about why, Lisa says how she misses Bart's lies. She burns the restraining order and the pole, while the family reunites and plays Tijuana Taxi.

In the subplot, Homer is hired as a greeter for Sprawl-Mart, a job he likes because there is no pressure to advance. The manager creates a fake Mexican ID card for him, in order to force him to work overtime without a pay bonus under threat of being deported, and Homer and his co-workers are later locked in the superstore late at night, with a chip implanted in the back of Homer's neck. He removes it and joins his co-workers in stealing from the store by using a forklift to move several plasma televisions.

Censorship
Following the 2011 Tōhoku earthquake and tsunami and the associated nuclear emergency, the episode was pulled from ProSieben due to jokes about nuclear meltdowns. It was also pulled from Network 10 in Australia for a similar reason.

References

External links
 

The Simpsons (season 16) episodes
2005 American television episodes